Elias Viktor Zebulon Lindholm (born 2 December 1994) is a Swedish professional ice hockey player and an alternate captain for the Calgary Flames of the National Hockey League (NHL). He was selected by the Carolina Hurricanes in the first round (5th overall) of the 2013 NHL Entry Draft, and spent his first five NHL seasons with them. He is the youngest Swedish-born player to score an NHL goal.

Playing career
Lindholm played with the Brynäs IF Swedish U20 team, he played four games for the U20 team and was the second-leading scorer for the U18 team. Lindholm was selected in the fourth round (86th overall) by SKA St. Petersburg of the KHL Draft.

Lindholm joined the Swedish Elite League, he played in 14 games, including two playoff games for Elitserien champion Brynäs. Once again a key offensive force for Brynäs U20 team and also the U19 World Junior A Challenge and 2012 U18 World Junior Championship tournaments.

Still with Brynäs, Lindholm led all junior players in the Elitserien with 30 points, scoring 11 goals with 19 assists. He skated for Sweden's U20 World Junior Championship in Ufa; scoring 2 goals with 2 assists and was minus-one with 4 penalty minutes in six games, where they won the silver medal.

Following being drafted by the Hurricanes, Lindholm made the opening roster for the 2013–14 NHL season.  He scored his first NHL goal in his fourth ever NHL game against Braden Holtby of the Washington Capitals on 10 October 2013. By scoring his first NHL goal at 18 years and 311 days, Lindholm became the youngest Swedish-born NHL player to score a goal, beating Gabriel Landeskog and his previous record, which was 18 years and 324 days.

On 8 March 2015 Lindholm scored his first career hat trick in a 3–4 win against the Edmonton Oilers.

On 23 June 2018, Lindholm was traded to the Calgary Flames along with teammate Noah Hanifin in exchange for Dougie Hamilton, Micheal Ferland, and prospect Adam Fox. He signed a six-year contract with the Flames on 16 July. In his first season with his new team, Lindholm mostly played top-line minutes with Johnny Gaudreau and Sean Monahan; all three scored career highs in points, with Lindholm scoring 27 goals and a total of 78 points. In the following season he set another new high in goals (29) despite the season being prematurely concluded due to the onset of the COVID-19 pandemic. He was by this point establishing himself as one of the Flames' most important forwards. When the 2020 Stanley Cup playoffs were belatedly held in a bubble in the summer, the Flames defeated the Winnipeg Jets in the qualifying round before falling to the Dallas Stars in the first round. Lindholm managed 2 goals and 4 assists in 10 playoff games.

In light of the pandemic, the 2020–21 season was held with a revised format, with all Canadian teams playing in the temporary North Division. The Flames had a tumultuous year, in the course of which coach Geoff Ward was replaced midway through the season by Darryl Sutter. Sutter made significant changes to the team's approach, and returned Lindholm to the centre position after two seasons primarily playing on the wing, now paired on a top line with wingers Gaudreau and Matthew Tkachuk that proved an immediate success. He scored 19 goals and 28 assists in only 56 games. The Flames did not qualify for the 2021 Stanley Cup playoffs.

The NHL's divisions and format returned to their pre-pandemic norms for the 2021–22 season, the Flames' first full season on returning coach Sutter. It would prove to be one of the most successful regular seasons in team history. With Gaudreau and Tkachuk, he formed one of the most dominant forward lines in the NHL, and all three members hit numerous personal and collective milestones over the course of the season. Lindholm scored his 40th goal of the season in an April 23 victory over the Vancouver Canucks, hitting that marker for the first time. Gaudreau and Tkachuk also scored 40 goals, the first time in 28 years that linemates had all achieved this, and only the fourth time in that span that a team had three 40-goal scorers. Lindholm finished the regular season with 42 goals and 40 assists for 82 points, while the Flames won the reconstituted Pacific Division. He was voted a finalist for the Frank J. Selke Trophy, awarded to the league's best defensive forward.

The Flames drew the Dallas Stars in the first round of the 2022 Stanley Cup playoffs, a rematch of the bubble playoffs two years prior, and a matchup in which the Flames were considered the favourites. Lindholm immediately distinguished himself by scoring the lone goal in the Flames' 1–0 victory in Game 1. The Stars proved a greater challenge than many had anticipated, largely due to an exceptional performance from goaltender Jake Oettinger, but the Flames eventually won the series in Game 7. The Flames drew the Edmonton Oilers in the second round, the first playoff "Battle of Alberta" in 31 years.

Personal life
Lindholm was born in Boden, Sweden, but grew up in Gävle. His father, Mikael Lindholm, is a retired ice hockey player who played in 404 SEL games and 18 NHL games with the Los Angeles Kings in 1989–90. Lindholm is a cousin of ice hockey player Calle Järnkrok and the younger brother of ice hockey player Oliver Lindholm. Lindholm is not related to Hampus Lindholm. Lindholm started playing hockey in Hanover, (Germany), at the age of three while his father was playing for the Hannover Scorpions.

Career statistics

Regular season and playoffs

International

References

External links

1994 births
Living people
Brynäs IF players
Calgary Flames players
Carolina Hurricanes draft picks
Carolina Hurricanes players
Charlotte Checkers (2010–) players
Swedish expatriate ice hockey players in Canada
Swedish expatriate ice hockey players in the United States
National Hockey League first-round draft picks
People from Boden Municipality
People from Gävle
Swedish ice hockey centres
Sportspeople from Norrbotten County